Tango Entertainment is an American film production company founded in 2017 by Lia Buman and Tim Headington. The company is best known for producing films Little Woods (2018) The Old Man & the Gun (2018), Skate Kitchen (2019), Little Fish (2020), Never Rarely Sometimes Always (2020), Resurrection (2022), and Aftersun (2022).

History
In January 2017, Lia Buman and Tim Headington launched the company, aiming to finance and produce film and television series.  The company's first film Skate Kitchen had its world premiere at the Sundance Film Festival in January 2018, and was released in August 2018, by Magnolia Pictures.  Little Woods directed by Nia DaCosta, premiered at the Tribeca Film Festival in April 2018, and was released in April 2019, by Neon.

Filmography

2010s

2020s

References

External links
 

American companies established in 2017
Film production companies of the United States
Entertainment companies established in 2017
American independent film studios